Adrian James Clarke (born 28 September 1974) is a former English footballer,  who played at every level of English football from the Premier League to the Conference South. The winger made nine first team appearances for Arsenal including five starts, and also represented Southend United, Stevenage, Margate and  Welling United. He also played for England Schoolboys and the England Under-18s.

After retiring in 2005 he became a sports journalist and broadcaster. He is a presenter, match analyst and co-commentator for Arsenal Player, a pundit for BT Sport and Premier League Productions, and can also be heard regularly on Talksport and BBC Radio Essex. He is a tactics expert for the Premier League website, and writes a weekly column for the Today newspaper in Singapore.

Playing career
Born in Cambridge, England, Clarke started his career at Arsenal. It was a different A Clarke (Albert) who won the FA Youth Cup of  the 1993–94 season under Pat Rice. 

Adrian Clarke, meanwhile, played a total of nine games for the first team, making his league debut on New Year's Eve 1994 as a substitute in a 3–1 defeat to Queens Park Rangers at Highbury, and his first start on 26 December 1995 in a 3-0 success at home to QPR once again. He had loan spells at Rotherham United and Southend United in 1996–97 before he signed for Southend on a free transfer in August 1997.

He played 75 league games for Southend scoring his first career goal in a 3–1 victory over Brentford on 5 September 1997.

Clarke joined Cumbrian side Carlisle United on loan in September 1999 before returning to Essex. He left Southend at the end of the 1999–2000 season and joined Stevenage Borough on a free transfer. In less than two seasons he played 85 games, scoring 19 goals,  before another loan spell at Hendon. He spent just a month at Hendon but was snapped up by Margate on a free transfer at the end of his loan spell.

Clarke played 97 games for Margate, captaining the team a number of times and scoring 11 goals, before joining Welling United. He was forced to retire with a serious pelvic injury.

Post-football
After he retired, Clarke pursued media studies, thus landing a job at the Southend Evening Echo as a journalist. He worked as deputy editor of icons.com, a football editorial and signed memorabilia website, and also wrote several feature articles for UEFA.com, Champions Magazine and FourFourTwo.

Clarke is currently a presenter, match analyst and co-commentator on Arsenal's official online television channel.
A regular guest on the Alan Brazil Sports Breakfast Show on Talksport, he also co-commentates for BBC Radio Essex, Talksport International and Talksport 2 and writes for several other major media clients around the world. He is a tactics columnist for the official Premier League website. 

Clarke is a regular panelist on the Totally Football Show and Handbrake Off podcasts.

References

External links

   Adrian Clarke.tv

Living people
1974 births
Sportspeople from Cambridge
English footballers
Association football midfielders
Arsenal F.C. players
Rotherham United F.C. players
Southend United F.C. players
Carlisle United F.C. players
Stevenage F.C. players
Hendon F.C. players
Margate F.C. players
Welling United F.C. players
Premier League players
English Football League players